James Johnstone (4 July 1801 – 24 February 1888) was a Scottish Liberal Party politician.

He was the oldest of 8 sons of James Raymond Johnstone (died 1830) of Alva, who was the son of John Johnstone (1734–1795).

He was elected at a by-election in June 1851 as the Member of Parliament (MP) for Clackmannanshire and Kinross-shire.
He was returned unopposed in 1852, and did not contest the 1857 election.

References

External links 
 

1801 births
1888 deaths
Members of the Parliament of the United Kingdom for Scottish constituencies
Scottish Liberal Party MPs
UK MPs 1847–1852
UK MPs 1852–1857
People from Clackmannanshire